WTVB (1590 AM) is a regional radio station located in Coldwater, Michigan.  It carries largely classic hits and local news and sports, with Westwood One as its source for national news, and carries Westwood One's Classic Hits Total format. Midwest Communications owns WTVB.

The call letters originally stood for Twin Valley  Broadcasters and are in no way connected to any television station, although the station bills itself as "The Voice of Branch County. The "valleys" mentioned (ironically Coldwater is in one of the highest parts of southern Lower Michigan) are apparently the short Coldwater River and the St. Joseph River in south-central Michigan.

WNWN/98.5 "WIN 98-5," licensed to Coldwater and now a country music station primarily targeting the Battle Creek and Kalamazoo areas, was originally WTVB-FM at 98.3, the FM signal that duplicated WTVB when FM radio was new.

WTVB was known as 16/TVB for many years. Even 20+ years after that campaign was stopped, and WTVB was officially known as AM 1590 WTVB, local community members have been known to still refer to the station as 16/TVB.

Translator
In 2011, Midwest Communications secured an FM translator from Christian broadcaster, Family Stations, Inc., and by January 13, 2012, WTVB was once again broadcasting on FM, at 95.5 MHz. With the addition of the translator, the station was able to provide programming to more areas of Branch County that were not able to receive a reliable signal from AM 1590 at night.

Programming
Local programming on WTVB consists of a morning show, "Midday Journal" and "Evening Journal". The News Department covers Branch County with breaking news and updates. The Sports Department covers local high school sports with up-to-the-minute status updates, and live broadcasts. Traditionally, WTVB follows the Coldwater Cardinals, but will occasionally air sporting events from neighboring cities and villages in the county.

Morning Show
"Delaney in the Morning", with Ken Delaney, is the station's weekday morning show, airing from 6-10AM. Previous show co-hosts have included Heather Daniels, Kevin Ireland, Jim Measel and Gary Hart.  The morning show features local news and agriculture reports, horoscopes, a "birthday club" and a Wall Street stock report from various local financial institutions. WTVB is a community-oriented station, and the show also includes various live interviews from community figures.

Midday Journal
The Midday Journal is an hour-long local production, starting at 12:00 noon each weekday. The program partly consists of local news and sports, stock reports and a look in the world of agri-business news, among others.

Evening Journal
The Evening Journal, on-air from 5 to 5:30 each weekday, is designed to be programming to "send you home" after a long workday. The programming includes NASCAR Updates, a look at stocks, and a "Coaches Corner" high school sports segment (except in summer).

Music
WTVB also features the "Greatest Classic Hits of the 60s, 70s, and 80s".

Prior to adopting the current classic hits format, WTVB was an affiliate of ABC's Classic Hits (formerly Oldies Radio) format.  Earlier, WTVB was an adult contemporary station with programming fed from ABC's Hits and Favorites (formerly "StarStation") network.

Sports

NASCAR
WTVB carries the Performance Racing Network's "Garage Pass" program, as well as "The Final Lap" from United Stations.

High school sports
High School sports usually dominate the school year at WTVB.  The station broadcasts all Coldwater Cardinal football and boys' basketball contests, home and away, as well as baseball in the spring.  They also air many girls' volleyball, basketball and softball games.  WTVB is considered the definitive source for Branch County high school sports.

References

Michiguide.com - WTVB History
WTVB Website

External links

TVB
Classic hits radio stations in the United States
Radio stations established in 1949
1949 establishments in Michigan
Midwest Communications radio stations